Events from the year 1933 in Japan.  It corresponds to Shōwa 8 (昭和8年) in the Japanese calendar.

Incumbents
Emperor: Hirohito
Empress consort: Empress Kōjun
Prime Minister: Saitō Makoto

Governors
Aichi Prefecture: Endo Ryusaku (until 21 July); Osamu (starting 21 July)
Akita Prefecture: Takabe Rokuzo
Aomori Prefecture: Taku Yasunobu
Ehime Prefecture: Jiro Ichinohe
Fukui Prefecture: Shigeo Odachi
Fukushima Prefecture: Akagi Tomoharo (until 21 July); Shiomi Hatakeyama (starting 21 July)
Gifu Prefecture: Umekichi Miyawaki
Gunma Prefecture: Masao Kanazawa
Hiroshima Prefecture: Michio Yuzawa
Ibaraki Prefecture: Abe Kashichi
Iwate Prefecture: Hidehiko Ishiguro
Kagawa Prefecture: Seikichi Kimijima (until 23 June); Yoshisuke Kinoshita (starting 23 June)
Kanagawa Prefecture: Sukenari Yokoyama
Kumamoto Prefecture: Keiichi Suzuki
Kochi Prefecture: Sakama Osamu
Kyoto Prefecture: Saito Munenori
Mie Prefecture: Hirose Hisatada (until 23 June); Saburo Hayakawa (starting 23 June)
Miyagi Prefecture: Michio Yuzawa (until 21 July); Asaji Akagi (starting 21 July)
Miyazaki Prefecture: Gisuke Kinoshita (until 23 June); Seikuchi Kimishima (starting 23 June)
Nagano Prefecture: Ishigaki Kuraji (until 4 August); Okoda Shuzo (starting 4 August)
Niigata Prefecture: Chiba Ryo
Okinawa Prefecture: Jiro Ino
Osaka Prefecture: Shinobu Agata 
Saga Prefecture: Saburo Hayakawa (until 23 June); Nagawa Fujioka (starting 23 June)
Saitama Prefecture: Shigezo Fukushima (until 23 June); Hirose Hisatada (starting 23 June)
Shiname Prefecture: Masaki Fukumura
Tochigi Prefecture: Gunzo Kayaba
Tokyo: Masayasu Kouksaka
Toyama Prefecture: Saito Itsuki
Yamagata Prefecture: Ishihara Yajiro

Events
January 1-May 31 – Defense of the Great Wall
February 21–March 1 – Battle of Rehe
March 2 – 1933 Sanriku earthquake.
April 1 – opening of Inariyama-kōen Station
April 15 – opening of Moro Station and Ogose Station
May – The 9th Far Eastern Games are held in Tokyo.
May 10 – Tateishi Electronic Manufacturing, as predecessor of Omron was founded.
May 31 – Tanggu Truce
July 12 – opening of Naka-Itabashi Station
August 1 – opening of Fujimigaoka Station, Inokashira-kōen Station, Kugayama Station, Takaido Station and Hamadayama Station
September 28 – Isetan Department Store of Shinjuku, officially opens
October 10 – opening of Keisei Ueno Station
establishment of Tokubetsu-keibi-tai (Metropolitan Police Department)

Births

 January 2 
 On Kawara, conceptual artist (d. 2014)
 Morimura Seiichi, novelist, author
January 11 – Mariko Okada, film actress
February 16 – Yoshishige Yoshida, film director and screenwriter
February 18 – Yoko Ono, singer, songwriter, and peace activist
March 1 – Yoko Minamida, film actress (d. 2009)
March 18 – Eikoh Hosoe,  photographer and filmmaker 
April 15 – Kōji Yada, voice actor (d. 2014)
April 16 – Takeo Watanabe, musician and composer (d. 1989)
May 10 – Chikage Oogi, actress and politician
May 15 – Juzo Itami, film director (d. 1997)
May 23 – Shōzō Iizuka, voice actor
May 29 – Yoshiaki Tsutsumi, businessman
July 17 – Keiko Awaji, film actress (d. 2014)
August 1 – Masaichi Kaneda, baseball pitcher 
August 9 – Tetsuko Kuroyanagi, actress, and author of children's book
August 16 – Bunta Sugawara, actor (d. 2014)
September 18 – Hiroshi Suzuki, Olympic swimmer
October 16 – Nobuyo Oyama, voice actress
October 20 – Chikara Hashimoto, baseball player (d. 2017)
October 22 – Mitsuko Kusabue, film actress
November 8 – Ayako Wakao, film actress
November 11 – Keiko Tanaka-Ikeda, Japanese artistic gymnast
December 1 – Fujiko F. Fujio, cartoonist (d. 1996)
December 10 – Mako, actor, voice actor and singer (d. 2006)
December 23 – Akihito, 125th Emperor of Japan, fifth child of Emperor Hirohito and Empress Kōjun

Deaths
January 23 – Sakai Toshihiko, writer and historian (b. 1871)
February 20 – Takiji Kobayashi, author and novelist (b. 1903)
March 18 – Sakuzō Yoshino, academic, and political scientist (b. 1878)
July 27 – Nobuyoshi Mutō, field marshal, Commander of the Kwantung Army, ambassador (b. 1868)
July 31 – Shimizu Shikin, novelist and women's rights activist (b. 1868)
September 21 – Kenji Miyazawa, poet and author of children's books (b. 1896)
October 15 – Inazō Nitobe, economist, author and educator (b. 1862)
November 3 – Princess Nobuko Asaka, daughter of Emperor Meiji (b. 1891)
November 8 – Uehara Yūsaku, field marshal (b. 1856)
December 8 – Yamamoto Gonnohyōe, admiral and Prime Minister of Japan (b. 1852)

See also
 List of Japanese films of the 1930s

References

 
1930s in Japan
Years of the 20th century in Japan